Ilkka-Eemeli Laari (born 29 May 1989) is a Finnish snowboarder. He was a participant at the 2014 Winter Olympics in Sochi.

References

1989 births
Snowboarders at the 2014 Winter Olympics
Living people
Olympic snowboarders of Finland
Finnish male snowboarders
Place of birth missing (living people)
University of Lapland alumni
21st-century Finnish people